James Gardner March (January 15, 1928 – September 27, 2018) was an American political scientist, sociologist, and economist. A professor at Stanford University in the Stanford Graduate School of Business and Stanford Graduate School of Education, he is best known for his research on organizations, his (jointly with Richard Cyert) seminal work on A Behavioral Theory of the Firm, and the organizational decision making model known as the Garbage Can Model.

Early life and education

Born in Cleveland, Ohio in 1928, March received his B.A. from the University of Wisconsin at Madison in 1945 in political science. He received his M.A. in 1950 and Ph.D. in 1953 from Yale University, both in political science.

James March was awarded honorary doctorate from numerous universities:  
 Copenhagen Business School (then: Copenhagen School of Economics), 1978
 Hanken School of Economics (Helsinki), 1979
 University of Wisconsin-Milwaukee, 1980
 University of Bergen, 1980;  (Economics)
 Uppsala University, 1987; (EkDhc, Faculty of Social Sciences)
 Helsinki School of Economics, 1991
 Dublin City University, 1994; (Economics)
 Göteborg University, 1998
 University of Poitiers, 2001
 University of Trento, 2000
 University of Southern Denmark, 2003
 Budapest University of Economics, 2003
 York University (Toronto), 2007
 Hautes Etudes Commerciales (HEC Paris), 2007
 Ramon Llull University (Barcelona), 2007
 Lappeenranta (Finland) University of Technology, 2008
 Stockholm (Sweden) Stockholm School of Economics, 2009

Career
From 1953 to 1964, he had served on the faculties of the Carnegie Institute of Technology as a senior research fellow and assistant professor, and later professor of industrial administration and psychology.

From 1964 to 1970, March joined the faculty at the University of California, Irvine as the founding Dean of the School of Social Sciences (1964–69). He was also a professor of psychology and sociology.

In 1970 March moved to Stanford University, where he was professor emeritus. During his time at Stanford, he had held several titles, including professor of political science and sociology, David Jacks Professor of Higher Education (1970–1978), professor of management (1978–1979), Fred H. Merrill Professor of Management (1979–1992), Jack Steele Parker Professor of International Management (1992–present). He had also served as a senior fellow at the Hoover Institution (1978–1987) and the founding director of the Scandinavian Consortium for Organizational Research (Scancor) (1989–1999).

He had been elected to the National Academy of Sciences, the American Academy of Arts and Sciences, the American Philosophical Society, and the National Academy of Education, and had been a member of the National Science Board. He was a member of the Royal Swedish Academy of Sciences and the Norwegian Academy of Science and Letters.

He interacted and communicated in many different forms as books, articles, interactive seminars, films and poetry.

Contributions
March was highly respected for his broad theoretical perspective which combined theories from psychology and other behavioural sciences. As a core member of the Carnegie School, he collaborated with the cognitive psychologist Herbert A. Simon on several works on organization theory.

March was also known for his seminal work on the behavioural perspective on the theory of the firm along with Richard Cyert (1963).

In 1972, March worked together with Johan Olsen and Michael D. Cohen on the systemic-anarchic perspective of organizational decision making known as the Garbage Can Model.

The scope of his academic work was broad but focused on understanding how decisions happen in individuals, groups, organizations, companies and society. He explores factors that influences decision making, such as risk orientation, leadership and the ambiguity of the present and the past; politics and vested interests by stakeholders; the challenges of giving and receiving advice; the challenges of organizational and individual learning and the challenges of balancing exploration and exploitation in organizations.

Awards
March received numerous awards, including:
 1968 Wilbur Lucius Cross Medal, Yale University
 1984 Scholarly Contributions to Management Award (Irwin Award), Academy of Management
 1995 Walter J. Gores Award for Excellence in Teaching, Stanford University
 1997 John Gaus Award from the American Political Science Association
 OMT Distinguished Scholar Award, Academy of Management   
 2004 Viipuri Prize, Viipuri School of Economics
 2004 Aaron Wildavsky Enduring Contribution Award, American Political Science Association
 2005 Herbert A. Simon Award, Budapest University of Economics
 2016 Progress Medal from the Society for Progress

Personal
James March was the father of four children and a grandfather. He died on September 27, 2018, aged 90.

Bibliography: Selected Articles 

 
 
 
 
 
 James G. March, "The Power of Power", pp. 39–70 in David Easton, ed., Varieties of Political Theory. Englewood Cliffs, NJ: Prentice-Hall, 1966.
 James G. March, "The Technology of Foolishness", Civiløkonomen (Copenhagen), 18 (1971) 4, 4–12.
 
 
 
 
 
 Martha S. Feldman and James G. March, "Information in Organizations as Signal and Symbol", Administrative Science Quarterly, 26 (1981) 171-186.
 James G. March, "Decisions in Organizations and Theories of Choice", pp. 205–244 in Andrew Van de Ven and William Joyce, eds., Perspectives on Organization Design and Behavior. New York, NY: Wiley Interscience, 1981.
 
 
 James G. March and Zur Shapira, "Behavioral Decision Theory and Organizational Decision Theory", pp. 92–115 in Gerardo Ungson and Daniel Braunstein, eds., Decision Making: An Interdisciplinary Inquiry. Boston, MA: Kent Publishing Company, 1982.
 
 James G. March and Guje Sevón, "Gossip, Information, and Decision-Making", pp. 95–107 in Lee S. Sproull and J. Patrick Crecine, eds., Advances in Information Processing in Organizations, Vol. I. Greenwich, CT: JAI Press, 1984.
 
 
 James R. Glenn, Jr., and James G. March, "Presidential Time Allocation 1970–1984", pp. 263–266 in Michael D. Cohen and James G. March, Leadership and Ambiguity, 2nd ed. Cambridge, MA: Harvard Business School Press, 1986.
 
 James G. March, "Theories of Making Choice and Making Decisions", pp. 305–325 in Rolf Wolff, ed., Organizing Industrial Development - Visible Guiding Hands. Berlin: de Gruyter, 1986.
 James G. March, "Ambiguity and Accounting: The Elusive Link between Information and Decision Making", Accounting, Organizations, and Society, 12 (1987) 153–168. Also pp. 31–49 in Barry E. Cushing, ed., Accounting and Culture, American Accounting Association, 1987.
 
 
 James G. March and Guje Sevón, "Behavioral Perspectives on Theories of the Firm", pp. 369–402 in W. Fred van Raaij, Gery M. van Veldhoven, and Karl-Erik Wärneryd, eds., Handbook of Economic Psychology. Dordrecht, Netherlands: Kluwer Academic Publishers, 1988.
 James G. March and Lee S. Sproull, "Technology, Management, and Competitive Advantage", pp. 144–173 in Paul S. Goodman, Lee S. Sproull and Associates, Technology and Organizations. San Francisco: Jossey-Bass, 1990.
 
 
 
 
 
 
 James G. March and Johan P. Olsen, "The Logic of Appropriateness", pp. 689–708 in Michael Moran, Martin Rein, and Robert E. Goodin (eds.) The Oxford Handbook of Public Policy. Oxford: Oxford University Press, 2006.
 James G. March and Johan P. Olsen, "Elaborating the 'New Institutionalism'", pp. 3–20 in R.A.W. Rhodes, S. Binder and B. Rockman (eds.) The Oxford Handbook of Political Institutions. Oxford: Oxford University Press, 2006.
 
 
 
 
 Michael D. Cohen, James G. March, and Johan P. Olsen, "The Garbage Can Model", International Encyclopedia of Organization Studies, Sage, forthcoming 2008.

Bibliography: Books 
March wrote many books including some with different co-authors: 

James G. March and Herbert A. Simon, Organizations. New York: Wiley, 1958.  2nd ed., Oxford:  Blackwell Publishers, 1993.  Translated into Arabic, Chinese, Dutch, French, German, Italian, Japanese, Polish, Portuguese, and Spanish. Voted the seventh most influential management book of the 20th century in a poll of the fellows of the Academy of Management.
Richard M. Cyert and James G. March, A Behavioral Theory of the Firm. Englewood Cliffs, NJ: Prentice-Hall, 1963.  2nd ed., Oxford: Blackwell Publishers, 1992.  Translated into Chinese, French, German, Italian, and Japanese.
James G. March, ed., Handbook of Organizations. Chicago, IL: Rand McNally, 1965.
Heinz Eulau and James G. March, eds., Political Science. Englewood Cliffs, NJ: Prentice-Hall, 1969.
Bernard R. Gelbaum and James G. March, Mathematics for the Social and Behavioral Sciences: Probability, Calculus and Statistics. Philadelphia, PA: W. B. Saunders Co., 1969.
Michael D. Cohen and James G. March, Leadership and Ambiguity: The American College President. New York, NY: McGraw-Hill, 1974.  2nd ed., Cambridge, MA: Harvard Business School Press, 1986.
Charles A. Lave and James G. March, An Introduction to Models in the Social Sciences.  New York: Harper and Row, 1975.  2nd ed., Lanham, MD: University Press of America, 1993.  Translated into Dutch, Japanese, and Spanish. (1975) 
James G. March and Johan P. Olsen, Ambiguity and Choice in Organizations. Bergen, Norway: Universitetsforlaget, 1976.   Translated into Japanese. (1980) 
James G. March, Autonomy as a Factor in Group Organization: A Study in Politics, New York: Arno Press, 1980.  
James G. March and Roger Weissinger-Baylon, eds., Ambiguity and Command: Organizational Perspectives on Military Decision Making. Cambridge, MA: Ballinger, 1986.
James G. March, Decisions and Organizations. Oxford: Basil Blackwell, 1988. . Translated into French, German, Italian, and Japanese.
James G. March and Johan P. Olsen, Rediscovering Institutions: The Organizational Basis of Politics.  New York: Free Press/Macmillan, 1989.  Translated into Italian and Spanish. 
James G. March, A Primer on Decision Making: How Decisions Happen.  New York, NY: The Free Press, 1994. Translated into Chinese, Greek, and Italian.   
James G. March, Fornuft og Forandring: Ledelse i en Verden Beriget av Uklarhet (Danish: Reason and Change: Leadership in a World Enriched by Ambiguity), articles selected and translated by Kristian Kreiner and Marianne Risberg.  Copenhagen: Samfundslitteratur, 1995.
James G. March and Johan P. Olsen, Democratic Governance.  New York, NY: The Free Press, 1995. . Translated into Italian.
James G. March, The Pursuit of Organizational Intelligence.  Oxford: Blackwell Publishers, 1999. .
James G. March, Martin Schulz, and Xueguang Zhou, The Dynamics of Rules: Change in Written Organizational Codes.  Stanford, CA: Stanford University Press, 2000.  .  Translated into Chinese and Italian.
Mie Augier and James G. March, eds., Economics of Change, Choice, and Organization: Essays in Memory of Richard M. Cyert.  Cheltenham, UK: Edward Elgar Publishing, Ltd., 2002.
James G. March and Thierry Weil, Le leadership dans les organizations. (French: Leadership in Organizations).  Paris: Les Presses de l’École des Mines, 2003.  Translated into English as On Leadership.  See below.
Mie Augier and James G. March, eds., Models of a Man: Essays in Memory of Herbert A. Simon.  Cambridge, MA: MIT Press, 2004.
James G. March, Valg, Vane og Vision: Perspektiver på Aspiration og Adfærd (Danish: Choice, Habit and Vision: Perspectives on Aspirations and Behavior), articles selected and translated by Kristian Kreiner and Mie Augier.  Copenhagen: Samfundslitteratur, 2005.
James G. March, Szervezeti tanulás és döntéshozatal (Hungarian: Organizational Learning and Decision Making), articles selected and translated by students at the László Rajk College.  Budapest: Alinea Kiadó, 2005.
James G. March and Thierry Weil, On Leadership.  Oxford, UK: Blackwell Publishers, 2005.  . Translated into Spanish, Korean, Italian, Chinese.
James G. March, Explorations in Organizations.  Stanford, CA: Stanford University Press, 2008.
James G. March, The Ambiguities of Experience.  Ithaca, NY: Cornell University Press, 2010.

Bibliography: Films 
Passion and Discipline: Don Quixote's Lessons for Leadership.  A film (67 minutes) conceived and written by James G. March, produced and directed by Steven C. Schecter.  Schecter Films (in association with the Stanford Graduate School of Business), 2003.
Heroes and History: The Lessons for Leadership from Tolstoy's War and Peace.  A film (65 minutes) conceived and written by James G. March, produced and directed by Steven C. Schecter.  Schecter Films (in association with the Yale School of Management and the Copenhagen business School), 2008.

Bibliography: Poetry 
James G. March, Academic Notes. London: Poets' and Painters' Press, 1974.
James G. March, Aged Wisconsin. London: Poets' and Painters' Press, 1977.
James G. March, Pleasures of the Process, London: Poets' and Painters' Press, 1980.
James G. March, Slow Learner. London: Poets' and Painters' Press, 1985.
James G. March, Minor Memos.  London: Poets' and Painters' Press, 1990.
James G. March, Late Harvest.  Palo Alto, CA: Bonde Press, 2000.
James G. March, Footprints.  Palo Alto, CA: Bonde Press, 2005.
James G. March, Quiet Corners.  Palo Alto, CA: Bonde Press, 2008.

References

External links 

Biography, Stanford faculty.
"In memoriam: James G. March"  Nils Brunsson, Organization Studies, 40(2), 291–295, January 29, 2019. 
In memorium: James G. March, Johan P. Olsen, University of Oslo, ARENA Centre for European Studies, 2018.
"Don Quichotte, Khoutouzov, James March : comprendre les organisations humaines et le leadership par Thierry Weil, The Conversation, September 28, 2018.
"Mort de l’économiste américain James Gardner March" par Thierry Weil (Chaire Futurs du travail et de l'industrie à Mines Paristech), Le Monde, Publié le 03 octobre 2018.
"On organizing: an interview with James G. March" by Dong, J., March, J.G. & Workiewicz, M, from the Journal of Organization Design, 6, 14 (2017).
Acceptance speech, Progress Medal, Society for Progress, 2016.
"Ideas as Art" by Diane Coutu, Harvard Business Review, 84(10): 82–91, October 2006.
"Who Are the Gurus’ Gurus?" by Prusak and Davenport, Harvard Business Review, December 2003.
James G. March research works, ResearchGate.

1928 births
2018 deaths
Writers from Cleveland
Members of the American Philosophical Society
Members of the Royal Swedish Academy of Sciences
American business theorists
American sociologists
 
Carnegie Mellon University faculty
University of California, Irvine faculty
Stanford University faculty
Stanford Graduate School of Education faculty
University of Wisconsin–Madison College of Letters and Science alumni
Yale University alumni
Members of the Norwegian Academy of Science and Letters
Members of the United States National Academy of Sciences